Hans Ronald Mueck  ( or /ˈmuːɪk/; born 1958) is an Australian sculptor working in the United Kingdom.

Biography
Born in 1958 to German parents in Melbourne, Australia, Ron Mueck grew up in the family business of puppetry and doll-making. He worked initially as a creative director in Australian children's television, before moving to America to work there in film and advertising. Most notably, he designed, performed, and voiced the character of Ludo in the 1986 Jim Henson fantasy film Labyrinth. He later collaborated with Henson again on the TV series The StoryTeller. In 1996, he was asked by Paula Rego, his mother-in-law, to make a small figure of Pinocchio for her group exhibition Spellbound: Art and Film, at the Hayward Gallery, London.

Mueck first came to public attention with his sculpture "Dead Dad". This portrayal of his recently deceased father - at roughly half-scale and made from memory and imagination – was included in the 1997 exhibition Sensation at the Royal Academy of Arts, London.

Mueck's first solo show was at the Anthony d’Offay Gallery, London in 1998. Today it sits in the foyer of the Danish Contemporary Art Museum ARoS in Aarhus.

Between 2000 and 2002, Mueck was Associate Artist at the National Gallery, London. During this two-year post he created the works Mother and Child, Pregnant Woman, Man in a Boat, and Swaddled Baby and culminated in an exhibition in 2003.

Mueck's most recent major touring exhibition began at Fondation Cartier pour l'Art Contemporain (Paris), in 2013, and travelled to Fundacion Proa, Buenos Aires., MAM, Rio de Janeiro (marking the biggest audience in the history of that museum), and São Paulo, exhibited at the Pinacoteca.

During 2016, Mueck exhibited at the Theseus Temple, Kunsthistorisches Museum, Vienna, and Sara Hildén Art Museum, Tampere, Finland.

In 2016 Mueck had a major solo presentation at the Museum of Fine Arts, Houston. As part of the Hull City of Culture, Mueck's works appeared as part of SKIN, at the Ferens Art Gallery (Hull, UK), alongside paintings by Lucian Freud and Édouard Manet, and Spencer Tunick's photographs of his installation Sea of Hull. The exhibition features a new work Poke, as well as Wild Man, Spooning Couple, Youth, Ghost, and Mask II.

Work

Mueck's sculpture responds to the minute details of the human body, playing with scale to produce engrossing visual images (a style known as hyperrealism).  Mueck spends a long time, sometimes more than a year, creating each sculpture. His subject matter is deeply private, and is often concerned with people's unspoken thoughts and feelings.

Gallery

See also
 Duane Hanson
 George Segal
 John De Andrea
 Carole Feuerman
 Patricia Piccinini
 Zharko Basheski
 Roman sculpture (historical connection)

References

1958 births
Living people
Australian people of German descent
Australian expatriates in the United Kingdom
20th-century Australian sculptors
Australian male voice actors
Australian contemporary artists
Realist artists
Hyperrealist artists
21st-century Australian sculptors